M.E.T.S. Charter School (formally known Mathematics, Engineering, Technology, & Science Charter School) was a seven-year comprehensive public charter middle school / high school that serves students in sixth through twelfth grades in Hudson County and Essex County of New Jersey, United States.  The M.E.T.S. Charter School had two campuses, one in Jersey City and one in Newark.  The school operates under the terms of a charter granted by the New Jersey Department of Education.  M.E.T.S. Charter School was an Early College Preparatory School that utilizes research-based instructional practices to achieve student proficiency in mathematics, engineering, technology, and science. M.E.T.S. Charter School encouraged students to take college level courses and graduate from high school within four years with up to 60 college credits and/or an associate degree.  Postsecondary success was promoted by prioritizing admission to a four-year college or university for each member of the graduating class.

In February 2020, New Jersey Commissioner of Education Lamont Repollet ordered the school to close at the end of the 2019-20 school year citing the school for "not operating in compliance with its charter".

As of the 2019–20 school year, the school had an enrollment of 713 students and 43.9 classroom teachers (on an FTE basis), for a student–teacher ratio of 16.2:1. There were 451 students (63.3% of enrollment) eligible for free lunch and 53 (7.4% of students) eligible for reduced-cost lunch.

Athletics
The M.E.T.S. Charter School Mustangs competed independently of any league or conference for soccer, volleyball, and softball.  Both boys and girls' basketball teams are part of the N.J. Charter School Athletic League. All athletics operate under the auspices of the New Jersey State Interscholastic Athletic Association. With 505 students in grades 10-12, the school had been classified by the NJSIAA for the 2019–20 school year as Group II for most athletic competition purposes, which included schools with an enrollment of 486 to 758 students in that grade range.

References

External links 
www.metscharterschool.org

Data for M.E.T.S. Charter School, National Center for Education Statistics

2011 establishments in New Jersey
2020 disestablishments in New Jersey
Charter schools in New Jersey
Educational institutions disestablished in 2020
Educational institutions established in 2011
High schools in Jersey City, New Jersey
Public high schools in Hudson County, New Jersey